The 1969 Summer Deaflympics, officially known as the 11th Summer Deaflympics, is an international multi-sport event that was celebrated from August 9 to 16, 1969 in Belgrade, Yugoslavia.

Sports 
 Artistic Gymnastics
 Athletics
 Basketball
 Cycling
 Diving
 Football
 Handball
 Shooting
 Swimming
 Table Tennis
 Tennis
 Volleyball
 Water Polo
 Wrestling

Medal Tally

References

Deaflympics
International sports competitions hosted by Yugoslavia
Summer Deaflympics
1960s in Belgrade
Sports competitions in Belgrade
Summer Deaflympics